The Men's 15 kilometres competition of the 2018 Winter Paralympics was held at Alpensia Biathlon Centre,
South Korea. The competition took place on 16 March 2018.

Medal table

Visually impaired
In the biathlon visually impaired, the athlete with a visual impairment has a sighted guide. The two skiers are considered a team, and dual medals are awarded.

The race was started at 14:50.

Standing
The race was started at 13:00.

Sitting
The race was started at 10:20.

See also
Biathlon at the 2018 Winter Olympics

References

Men's 15 kilometres